The Fort Lauderdale Strikers were an American soccer team established in 1988 as part of the third American Soccer League. In 1990, it moved to the American Professional Soccer League where it spent five seasons before folding in 1994. The Strikers won the 1989 ASL championship, as well as the 1989 National Pro Soccer Championship.

History
In October 1987, the American Soccer League announced that it had awarded a franchise to Joe Robbie which would be located in Fort Lauderdale, Florida. Robbie, who owned the Minnesota Strikers of the Major Indoor Soccer League announced his intentions of resurrecting the name Fort Lauderdale Strikers and hired Wim Suurbier to coach the team. The team played their home games in Lockhart Stadium. In their first season, the Strikers stormed the ASL, finishing with a 14-6 record, best in the league, before falling to the Washington Diplomats in the finals. In 1988, Robbie later sold his share in the team to Noel Lemon. In January 1989, Suurbier resigned as coach to be replaced by Thomas Rongen. In their second season the Strikers did almost as well, finishing the season at 12-8. They went on to defeat the Boston Bolts for the 1989 championship. This qualified them for the 1989 National Pro Soccer Championship, the first American national outdoor soccer championship since the collapse of the North American Soccer League in 1984. On September 9, 1989, the Strikers defeated the San Diego Nomads of the Western Soccer League, 3–1, to win the title. Following that game, the ASL merged with the WSL to form the American Professional Soccer League. They played five more years in that league. For the 1990 season seven home games were played at Pompano Beach Municipal Stadium and five at the Royal Palm Polo Club in Boca Raton, after the Broward School Board denied the team access to Lockhart Stadium. In January 1991, the Strikers merged with the Orlando Lions. The combined team retained the Strikers name, uniforms and staff. Soon after Lemons sold the team to Bryan Lockwood.

The team had an ongoing rivalry with the Tampa Bay Rowdies that stemmed from Robbie's previous Strikers team's rivalry with same Rowdies, while playing in the NASL.

Kit
When they first played in 1988, the Strikers played in a cream shirt with white sleeves and black shorts with white socks. That kit has been used as their home kit from that time until they dissolved.

Their away kit from 1988 to 1990 was a red shirt and white shorts with white socks. After their second game in the 1990 season, they switched to an all-white kit and played in that until 1994 when they dissolved.

Year-by-year

Coaches
 Wim Suurbier (1988)
 Thomas Rongen (1989–1994)

See also

Fort Lauderdale Strikers (1977–1983)
Fort Lauderdale Sun Division 2 team of the short-lived USL (1984–85)
Fort Lauderdale Strikers (1994–1997)
Miami Fusion Now defunct MLS team (1997–2001)
Fort Lauderdale Strikers Division 2 team competing in the NASL, originally named Miami FC
Fort Lauderdale–Tampa Bay rivalry

References

External links
Fort Lauderdale Strikers history
Fort Lauderdale Striker fan blog
American Soccer League Final Standings: 1988-1989
American Professional Soccer League Final Standings: 1990-1994

 
American Soccer League (1988–89) teams
Defunct soccer clubs in Florida
American Professional Soccer League teams
1987 establishments in Florida
1994 disestablishments in Florida
Phoenix clubs (association football)
Association football clubs established in 1987
Association football clubs disestablished in 1994
Soccer clubs in Florida